Total Control is a real time strategy video game, developed and published by the Russian company DOCA  in 1995.

References 

1995 video games
Real-time strategy video games